The Oaks d'Italia is a Group 2 flat horse race in Italy open to three-year-old thoroughbred fillies. It is run at Milan over a distance of 2,200 metres (about 1 mile and 3 furlongs), and it is scheduled to take place each year in May or June.

It is Italy's equivalent of The Oaks, a famous race in England.

History
The event has been contested over 2,200 metres for most of its history, and for a period it held Group 1 status. Its distance was extended to 2,400 metres in 1988, and it reverted to 2,200 metres in 1995. The race was downgraded to Group 2 level in 2007.

The Oaks d'Italia is currently held about three weeks after the Derby Italiano.

Records
Leading jockey since 1970 (4 wins):
 Gianfranco Dettori – Marmolada (1980), Ilenia (1982), Right Bank (1983), Paris Royal (1984)
 Walter Swinburn – Ivor's Image (1986), Melodist (1988), Possessive Dancer (1991), Zomaradah (1998)
 Fabio Branca - Cherry Collect (2012), Charity Line (2013), Final Score (2014), Lamaire (2019)

Leading trainer since 1985 (4 wins):

 Peter Schiergen – Guadalupe (2002), Goose Bay (2008), Danedream (2011), Lovelyn (2015)
 Stefano Botti - Cherry Collect (2012), Charity Line (2013), Final Score (2014), Folega (2017)

Leading owner since 1985 (3 wins):

 Effevi  - Cherry Collect (2012), Charity Line (2013), Final Score (2014)

Winners since 1985

Earlier winners

 1910: Wistaria
 1911: Desta
 1912: Makufa
 1913: Arianna
 1914: Fausta
 1915: Galliflora
 1916: Juma
 1917: Gianpietrina
 1918: Stfadda
 1919: Alcimaca
 1920: Sissa
 1921: Sorbita
 1922: Anderina
 1923: Giovanna Dupre
 1924: Stella d'Italia
 1925: Acacia Rosa
 1926: Neroccia
 1927: Francavilla
 1928: Erba
 1929: Ortona
 1930: Ostiglia
 1931: Alena
 1932: Jacopa del Sellaio
 1933: Dossa Dossi
 1934: Bernina
 1935: Mahatma
 1936: Archidamia
 1937: Amerina
 1938: Silvana
 1939: Ematina
 1940: Michela
 1941: Pallade
 1942: Alemagna
 1943: Fior d'Orchidea
 1944: Nervesa
 1945: Zamora
 1946: Piavola
 1947: Zambra
 1948: Astolfina
 1949: Samba
 1950: La Cadette
 1951: Staffa
 1952: Ola
 1953: Dacia
 1954: Feira de Rio
 1955: Theodorica
 1956: La Canea
 1957: Angela Rucellai
 1958: Beatrice Adams
 1959: Feria
 1960: Caorlina
 1961: Nuria
 1962: Alibella
 1963: Anticlea
 1964: Alice Frey
 1965: Tadolina
 1966: Macrina d'Alba
 1967: Dolina
 1968: Soragna
 1969: Raimonda da Capua
 1970: Batavia
 1971: Tingitana
 1972: Kerkenna
 1973: Orsa Maggiore
 1974: Red Girl
 1975: Carnauba
 1976: Claire Valentine
 1977: Zabarella
 1978: Giustizia
 1979: Maria Waleska
 1980: Marmolada
 1981: Val d'Erica
 1982: Ilenia
 1983: Right Bank
 1984: Paris Royal

See also
 List of Italian flat horse races

References
 Racing Post:

 galopp-sieger.de – Oaks d'Italia.
 horseracingintfed.com – International Federation of Horseracing Authorities – Oaks d'Italia (2017).
 ippodromimilano.it – Albi d'Oro – Oaks.
 pedigreequery.com – Oaks d'Italia – Milano San Siro.
 tbheritage.com – Oaks d'Italia.

Flat horse races for three-year-old fillies
Horse races in Italy
Sport in Milan